Grimstad is a town in Grimstad municipality in Agder county, Norway. The town is also the administrative centre of the municipality. It is located on the Skaggerak coast in Southern Norway along the Groosefjorden, between the towns of Arendal (to the northeast) and Lillesand (to the southwest).

Grimstad Church is located on a small hill overlooking the town's harbour. The University of Agder is located in the town as well.

History

The village of Grømstad existed for a long time as part of the ancient prestegjeld of Fjære. It is reportedly first mentioned as a harbor in the 16th century. Eight years after he was deposed, King Christian II of Denmark–Norway (1513–1523) attempted to recover his kingdoms. A tempest scattered his fleet off the Norwegian coast, and on 24 October 1531, they took refuge at Grimstad. On 1 July 1532, he surrendered to his rival, King Frederick I of Denmark, in exchange for a promise of safe conduct. King Frederick failed to honor his promise and imprisoned Christian until he died.

An inn is recorded at Grimstad as early as 1607. In 1622, the village was granted ladested status under nearby Arendal due to its growing harbour and trading which gave it certain trading rights.  By 1747, Grimstad was identified as a sailing community and a recognized haunt of smugglers. During the Napoleonic Wars, England blockaded Norway and in 1811, an English brig entered the harbor to capture blockade runners, but was vigorously repulsed and did not return.

John Frederik Classen, who owned the Frolands Værk (an ironworks located nearby), obtained concessions to export and import through Grimstad and bypass Arendal with its customs dues. Grimstad was awarded kjøpstad status in 1816.

The town of Grimstad was established as a municipality on 1 January 1838 (see formannskapsdistrikt law). On 1 January 1878, part of the neighboring municipality of Fjære (population: 948) was transferred to Grimstad. Again, on 1 January 1960, another part of Fjære (pop: 344) was transferred to the town of Grimstad.

On 1 January 1971, the rural municipalities of Fjære (pop: 6,189) and Landvik (pop: 2,781) were merged with the town of Grimstad (pop: 2,794) to form a significantly larger municipality of Grimstad with a total population of 11,764 at the time of the merger.

Name
The town's name was originally Grømstad, when Norway belonged to the Danish kingdom. The name was misunderstood and became Grimstad during the registration of Norwegian cities and small places. The site of the town was originally the port of the old  farm.

Media gallery

See also
List of towns and cities in Norway

References

Cities and towns in Norway
Populated places in Agder
Port cities and towns in Norway
Grimstad
1622 establishments in Norway